Mojibur Rahman (born 1 November 1993) is a Bangladeshi cricketer. He made his List A debut for Victoria Sporting Club in the Dhaka Premier Division Cricket League on 8 May 2016. He made his first-class debut for Chittagong Division in the 2016–17 National Cricket League on 27 December 2016.

References

External links
 

1993 births
Living people
Bangladeshi cricketers
Chittagong Division cricketers
Victoria Sporting Club cricketers
People from Chittagong